John Daniel Singleton (January 6, 1968  April 28, 2019) was an American director, screenwriter, and producer. He made his feature film debut writing and directing Boyz n the Hood (1991), for which he was nominated for the Academy Award for Best Director, becoming, at age 24, the first African American and youngest person to have ever been nominated for that award.

Since then, Singleton has written and directed other films such as the romantic drama Poetic Justice (1993), the socially conscious drama Higher Learning (1995), the historical drama Rosewood (1997), the crime film Shaft (2000), the coming-of-age drama Baby Boy (2001) and the action films 2 Fast 2 Furious (2003), and Four Brothers (2005). In television, he  the television crime drama Snowfall and directed episodes of shows such as Empire, Rebel and the fifth episode of The People v. O.J. Simpson: American Crime Story. He was nominated for the Primetime Emmy Award for Outstanding Directing for a Limited Series, Movie, or Dramatic Special for the latter.

One of the most successful and groundbreaking directors in African-American cinema, Singleton's films represented the African-American experience in urban populations, focusing on themes such as black masculinity, trauma, racism and ethnicity. Singleton was also known for casting rappers/musicians in prominent roles such as Ice Cube, Tupac Shakur, Janet Jackson, Q-Tip, Busta Rhymes, Tyrese Gibson, Snoop Dogg, Ludacris and André 3000.

Early life 
John Singleton was born on January 6, 1968 in Los Angeles, the son of Shelia Ward-Johnson (later Morgan), a pharmaceutical company sales executive, and Danny Singleton, a real estate agent, mortgage broker, and financial planner. In a 1993 DIRT magazine interview with Veronica Chambers, Singleton says of his childhood, "When I was growing up, comic books, video games and movies were my buffer against all the drugs, the partying and shit [...] I never grew up with a whole lot of white people. I grew up in a black neighborhood." He attended Eisenhower High School, Blair High School, Pasadena City College and the USC School of Cinematic Arts.

Singleton was a Spring 1987 initiate into the Beta Omega Chapter of Kappa Alpha Psi and graduated from USC in 1990. Singleton considered pursuing computer science, but enrolled in USC's Filmic Writing program under Margaret Mehring. The program was designed to take students directly into the Hollywood system as proficient writer/directors.

Career

1990s: Early career and breakthrough

In 1991, Singleton made his film debut with Boyz n the Hood., a coming-of-age crime drama about three childhood friends growing up in the crime-ridden neighbourhood of South Central LA. Starring Cuba Gooding, Jr., Ice Cube, Nia Long, Morris Chestnut, Angela Bassett, Regina King, and Laurence Fishburne, the film was both a critical and commercial success. It debuted at the Cannes Film Festival. For his efforts, Singleton received Academy Award nominations for Best Original Screenplay and Best Director. At age 24, he became the youngest person ever nominated for Best Director and the first African-American to be nominated for the award. In 2002, the United States Library of Congress deemed the film "culturally significant" and selected it for preservation in the National Film Registry.

In 1992, following the success of Boyz n the Hood, Singleton went on to direct VFX-driven "Remember the Time" music video for Michael Jackson, which featured Eddie Murphy, Iman, and Magic Johnson. The song and the music video were well-received and peaked at number three on the Billboard Hot 100 and number one on the Billboard Hot R&B Singles as well as the Mainstream Top 40 chart. It is certified 3× Platinum by the Recording Industry Association of America (RIAA). Internationally, the song was a Top 10 hit in nine countries, peaking at No.1 in New Zealand, at No.2 in Spain and No.3 in the United Kingdom.

In 1993, Singleton wrote and directed his second film, Poetic Justice, a romantic drama about a young African-American woman named Justice (played by Janet Jackson, in her film debut) who writes poetry to deal with the loss of her boyfriend to gun violence but soon encounters a postal worker (played by Tupac Shakur), who helps her overcome depression. The film received mixed reviews from critics, but earned Jackson Academy Award and Golden Globe nominations for Best Original Song for "Again", which reached number one on the Billboard Hot 100. The film has developed a cult following, especially for the chemistry between Jackson and Shakur and is now considered as one of Singleton's most enduring films.

In 1995, Singleton wrote and directed Higher Learning, a socially conscious drama about the intense racial and social tension in a university campus. Like Poetic Justice, the film received mixed reviews. Of his work with some of the 1990s' most visible rappers, Singleton states, "I come from the same place as rappers. It's cool because it's just another form of communication. I have the same sensibilities as rappers. I'm not bourgeois and everything, thinking I'm better than folks. I see myself as the first filmmaker from the hip-hop generation. I've grown up with hip-hop music. The films I make have a hip-hop aesthetic. It may not have rap in it, but there's a whole culture and politics that go with the music. It's young, Black culture-that's what I deal with in my films."

In 1997, following the mixed reception of Poetic Justice and Higher Learning, Singleton's fourth film, Rosewood, a historical drama based on racial violence during the 1923 Rosewood massacre in Florida, received generally positive reviews and was entered into the 47th Berlin International Film Festival, where it was nominated for the Golden Bear.

2000s: Continued success
In 2000, Singelton co-wrote, co-produced and directed Shaft, a sequel-remake of the original 1971 film of the same name starring Richard Roundtree in the title role. Starring Samuel L. Jackson as Shaft's relative, John Shaft Jr., the film received generally positive reviews and was a box office success, grossing over $107 million worldwide. successful critically and commercially.

In 2001, ten years after the release of Boyz n the Hood, Singleton wrote, produced, and directed Baby Boy, a coming-of-age comedy-drama about Jody Summers (played by Tyrese Gibson), a 20-year-old man who fathers two children by two different women- Yvette (played by Taraji P. Henson) and Peanut (played by Tamara LaSeon Bass) but still lives with his own mother (played by Adrienne-Joi Johnson) while he lives and learns in his everyday life in the hood of Los Angeles. The film received predominantly positive reviews, many of whom consider it to be a return to form for Singleton and one of his best films.

Singleton's next film was 2 Fast 2 Furious (2003), the sequel to The Fast and the Furious (2001) and the second installment in the Fast and Furious series. The film was a box office success, grossing over $236 million worldwide, making it the highest-grossing film in the series at the time, as well as the highest-grossing film of Singleton's career.

In 2005, Singleton teamed with writer-director Craig Brewer to finance and produce the independent film Hustle and Flow, once it was clear that most other major backers would not clear it for release. The film stars Terrence Howard as a Memphis hustler and pimp who faces his aspiration to become a rapper. Also starring Anthony Anderson and Taraji P. Henson in supporting roles, the film received positive reviews and earned two Academy Awards nominations for Best Actor and Best Original Song, winning the latter.

That same year, Singleton directed Four Brothers, a blaxploitation-inspired action film starring Mark Wahlberg, Tyrese Gibson, André Benjamin and Garrett Hedlund as four adopted brothers who return to their hometown of Detroit, Michigan to avenge the murder of their adoptive mother. The film received mixed reviews from critics but grossed $92 million worldwide.

In 2003, Singleton received a star at the Hollywood Walk of Fame.

2010s: Unrealised projects
In 2011, Singleton was in talks with Ice Cube, who worked with Singleton on Boyz n the Hood and Higher Learning, to direct a biopic about Cube's rap group N.W.A. before F. Gary Gray was hired in August 2012. The film was released in 2015 to positive reviews and box office success.

Two years later, in 2013, Singleton was attached as the writer-director of a biopic about the life, career and death of rapper Tupac Shakur. On April 3, 2015, Singleton reported that production was put on hold. Following creative differences with Morgan Creek Productions, Singleton had stepped down as director, and was replaced by Carl Franklin. Singleton also stated he was planning on making a competing film about Tupac.

The film was eventually released in 2017 as All Eyez on Me, which was negatively received by critics and audiences and Singleton himself, who intended to make his own biopic about Shakur as well as a biopic about the rap group Three 6 Mafia, who worked with Singleton on Hustle & Flow, prior to his death in 2019.

2017-2019: Transition to television and final years
Following the release of the critically-panned action thriller film Abduction (2011), Singleton spent the final years of his career focusing on television.

After directing episodes of the critically acclaimed TV shows Empire and American Crime Story, in 2017, he served as an executive producer and director of the crime drama series Rebel for BET, which focuses on Oakland police officer Rebecca "Rebel" Knight, who after her brother was killed by police, began working as a private investigator.

That same year, Snowfall, a crime drama series co-created and executively produced by Singleton for FX, premiered on July 5, 2017. Singleton co-wrote the screenplays for the first two episodes with series creators Eric Amadio and Dave Andron and directed the finales for the first two seasons. The series stars Damson Idris as Franklin Saint, a budding young drug dealer from South Central L.A., and it depicts how the community is affected by the 1980s crack epidemic. This was one of the last projects Singleton worked on before his death in 2019.

Influences and themes

Influences
Singleton cited the original Star Wars film as one of his strongest influences and the works of filmmaker Steven Spielberg and playwright August Wilson as a source of inspiration. Singleton was influenced by his friend and fellow filmmaker Spike Lee. The two met in 1986, at a screening of Lee's film She's Gotta Have It, two weeks before Singleton started attending USC.

Themes
Singleton's films have received praise for their authentic representation of the black experience in America whilst also incorporating a hip-hop energy and style. His films have often examined black masculinity, violence, racism and ethnicity, racial prejudice, trauma, and other political themes.

Legacy
As the first African-American nominated for the Academy Award for Best Director in 1992 for Boyz n the Hood, Singleton has paved the way for several African-American filmmakers including Jordan Peele, Ryan Coogler, Ava DuVernay, Steve McQueen and Barry Jenkins, who have also gained Academy Awards for their work.

Personal life 
Singleton was the father of seven children. With his wife, Tosha Lewis, he had his first daughter Justice Maya Singleton (born 1992), named after the lead character of the same name (played by Janet Jackson) in Poetic Justice and the poet Maya Angelou respectively.

Singleton has a son named Maasai Singleton (born April 3, 1996) and a daughter named Cleopatra "Cleo" Singleton (born September 6, 1998) with ex-girlfriend Vestria Barlow. On October 12, 1996, Singleton married Ghanaian actress Akosua Gyamama Busia, the daughter of Ghana's second Prime Minister Kofi Abrefa Busia. The couple had a daughter named Hadar Busia-Singleton (born April 3, 1997), who appeared in Tears of the Sun (2003) and other films. Singleton and Busia divorced in June 1997. He had one daughter in 2010 with Mitzi Andrews, an actress/model and teacher based in Toronto, Canada. He also had a son, Seven, with Rayvon Jones.
 
In 1999, Singleton pleaded no contest to misdemeanor battery charges after attacking an ex-girlfriend during a dispute over child visitation. He was sentenced to three years probation and ordered to make a film on domestic violence.
 
On August 23, 2007, Singleton was involved in an automobile accident in which he struck a jaywalking pedestrian, Constance Russell, 57, of Los Angeles. Staying on the scene until the police arrived, Singleton was not under the influence of alcohol or other substances, and was released after being questioned. Russell died later in the hospital. The case was turned over to the District Attorney, but no charges were ever filed.

On March 19, 2014, Singleton criticized popular studios for "refusing to let African-Americans direct black-themed films". Singleton told an audience of students at Loyola Marymount University "They ain't letting the black people tell the stories." He also added, "They want black people [to be] what they want them to be. And nobody is man enough to go and say that. They want black people to be who they want them to be, as opposed to what they are. The black films now—so-called black films now—they're great. They're great films. But they're just products. They're not moving the bar forward creatively. ...When you try to make it homogenized, when you try to make it appeal to everybody, then you don't have anything that's special."

Death 
On April 17, 2019, Singleton suffered a stroke and was placed under intensive care. He reportedly began to experience weakness in his legs after returning to the United States from a trip to Costa Rica. On April 25, it was reported that he was in a coma, but his daughter stated otherwise. On April 28, Singleton was removed from life support and he died at the age of 51 at Cedars-Sinai Medical Center.

Dozens of actors and musicians paid tribute to him.

American rapper and actor Ice Cube, who worked with Singleton in Boyz n the Hood and Higher Learning, said: "There are no words to express how sad I am to lose my brother, friend & mentor. He loved [to] bring the black experience to the world." Cuba Gooding Jr., who was given his first major role by Singleton in Boyz n the Hood, paid tribute to his late friend by singing "One Day More" from Les Misérables, a favorite song of Singleton.

A private funeral was held on May 6, 2019, in Los Angeles, and Singleton was buried at Forest Lawn Memorial Park, Hollywood Hills. The official cause of death was acute ischemic stroke, intracerebral hemorrhage, and hypertension.

Filmography

Film 

{| style="width:100%;"
|- style="vertical-align:top;"
| width="50%" |
Producer only
{| class="wikitable"
|-
!Year
!Title
!Notes
|-
|2005
|Hustle & Flow
|
|-
|2006
|Black Snake Moan
|
|-
|2007
|Illegal Tender
|Also music supervisor
|-
|2008
|The Making of 'Illegal Tender|Documentary short
|-
|}

| width="50%" |Executive producer| width="50%" |
|}Acting rolesOther credits Television Acting rolesOther credits'''

 Music video 

 Remember the Time'' for Michael Jackson (1992)

See also 
 List of youngest Academy Award nominees

References

Further reading 

Carr, Joi (March 2018) Boyz n the hood: shifting Hollywood terrain.  Peter Lang Publishing, Inc. 
The Real Boyz N The Hood - John D. Singleton (Tre), Michael Winters (Doughboy) and Roman J. Artiste (Ricky).*

External links 

Films of John Singleton, a critical fan site endorsed by Singleton.

1968 births
2019 deaths
20th-century American male writers
20th-century American screenwriters
21st-century American male writers
21st-century American screenwriters
Action film directors
African-American film directors
African-American film producers
African-American male actors
African-American male writers
African-American screenwriters
African-American television producers
American film producers
American male film actors
American male screenwriters
American male television actors
American male television writers
American music video directors
Blair High School (Pasadena, California) alumni
Burials at Forest Lawn Memorial Park (Hollywood Hills)
Film directors from Los Angeles
Film producers from California
Male actors from California
Male actors from Los Angeles
Pasadena City College alumni
People from Los Angeles
People from South Los Angeles
Screenwriters from California
Television producers from California
USC School of Cinematic Arts alumni
Writers from Los Angeles
Fellows of the American Physical Society